In enzymology, a CMP-N-acetylneuraminate monooxygenase is an enzyme that catalyzes the chemical reaction

CMP-N-acetylneuraminate + 2 ferrocytochrome b5 + O2 + 2 H+  CMP-N-glycoloylneuraminate + 2 ferricytochrome b5 + H2O

The 4 substrates of this enzyme are CMP-N-acetylneuraminate, ferrocytochrome b5, O2, and H+, whereas its 3 products are CMP-N-glycoloylneuraminate, ferricytochrome b5, and H2O.

This enzyme belongs to the family of oxidoreductases, specifically those acting on paired donors, with O2 as oxidant and incorporation or reduction of oxygen. The oxygen incorporated need not be derived from O2 with another compound as one donor, and incorporation of one atom o oxygen into the other donor.  The systematic name of this enzyme class is CMP-N-acetylneuraminate,ferrocytochrome-b5:oxygen oxidoreductase (N-acetyl-hydroxylating). Other names in common use include CMP-N-acetylneuraminic acid hydroxylase, CMP-Neu5Ac hydroxylase, cytidine monophosphoacetylneuraminate monooxygenase, N-acetylneuraminic monooxygenase, and cytidine-5'-monophosphate-N-acetylneuraminic acid hydroxylase.  This enzyme participates in aminosugars metabolism.

References

 
 
 
 
 

EC 1.14.18
Enzymes of unknown structure